Zahav (from  zahav, lit. "gold") is an Israeli restaurant in Philadelphia founded in 2008. It is managed by head chef Michael Solomonov.

History

Zahav received the James Beard Foundation Award for Outstanding Restaurant in 2019 and was listed as one of the 100 Best Wine Restaurants in the United States by Wine Enthusiast in 2015.

Critics have called its pomegranate lamb shoulder with chickpeas its signature dish.

References

External links
 

2008 establishments in Pennsylvania
Israeli restaurants
Kosher style restaurants
Restaurants established in 2008
Restaurants in Philadelphia